The Amphibious Vehicle, Tracked (LVT) is an amphibious warfare vehicle and amphibious landing craft, introduced by the United States Navy and United States Marine Corps.  (The USN and USMC use "L" to designate Amphibious vessels, also called "L class.") The United States Army, Canadian Army and British Army used several LVT models during World War II, and referred to those vehicles as "Landing Vehicle, Tracked."

Originally intended solely as cargo carriers for ship to shore operations, they evolved into assault troop and fire support vehicles. The types were known as amphtrack, "amtrak", "amtrac", etc. (portmanteaus of "amphibious tractor"), and "alligator" or "gator."

Development

The Alligator
The LVT had its origins in a civilian rescue vehicle called the Alligator. Developed by Donald Roebling in 1935, the Alligator was intended to operate in swampy areas, inaccessible to both traditional cars and boats. Two years later, Roebling built a redesigned vehicle with improved water speed. The United States Marine Corps, which had been developing amphibious warfare doctrine based on the ideas of Lieutenant colonel Earl Hancock Ellis and others, became interested in the machine after learning about it through an article in Life magazine and convinced Roebling to design a more seaworthy model for military use.

Both the US Navy and Roebling resisted the idea of a military design, the US Navy because it felt conventional landing craft could do the job, and Roebling because he wished his invention to be used only for peaceful purposes. Roebling was persuaded after war broke out in Europe, and completed a militarized prototype by May 1940. The Bureau of Ships requested a second prototype with a more powerful engine, and the USMC tested the design in November 1940. Impressed by the second prototype, the Bureau of Ships placed a contract for production of 100 units of a model using all-steel construction, for a more rugged and easily produced design, and the first LVT-1 was delivered in July 1941. Another 200 units were ordered even before the first production units were delivered. After more improvements to meet requirements of the Navy, made difficult by Roebling's lack of blueprints for the initial designs, the vehicle was adopted as "Landing Vehicle Tracked" or LVT.

The LVT-1 design
The contract to build the first 200 LVTs was awarded to the Food Machinery Corporation (FMC), a manufacturer of insecticide spray pumps and other farm equipment, which built some parts for the Alligators. The initial 200 LVTs were built at FMC's factory in Dunedin, Florida, where most of the improvement work had been done as well. The first production LVT rolled out of the plant in July, 1941. Later, wartime LVT production was expanded by FMC and the Navy to four factories, including the initial facility in Dunedin; the new facilities were located in Lakeland, Florida, Riverside, California, and San Jose, California.

Originally intended to carry replenishment from ships to shore, they lacked armor protection and their tracks and suspension were unreliable when used on hard terrain. However, the Marines soon recognized the potential of the LVT as an assault vehicle. A battalion of LVTs was ready for 1st Marine Division by 16 February 1942. The LVTs saw their first operational use in Guadalcanal, where they were used exclusively for landing supplies. About 128 LVTs were available for the landings.

LVT-2 Buffalo and other developments
As early as January 1940, Roebling had prepared preliminary sketches of an LVT with a gun turret to provide fire support to the landing waves. The concept languished until June 1941, when USMC recommended development of an LVT armed with a 37mm gun and three machine guns and armored against 0.50 (12.7mm) machine gun fire. Development was slow and ultimately involved a complete redesign of the LVT, the LVT-2 Buffalo. Armored versions were introduced as well as fire support versions, dubbed Amtanks, which were fitted with turrets from Stuart series light tanks (LVT(A)-1) and Howitzer Motor Carriage M8s (LVT(A)-4).

Among other upgrades were a new powerpack (engine and cooling accessories), also borrowed from the Stuarts, and a rubber "torsilastic" suspension which improved performance on land. After Borg-Warner evaluated the LVT-1, Borg-Warner and FMC began work on new designs. FMC was assisted by faculty from Caltech and the University of California and developed the designs that became the LVT-2 and the LVT(A)-1. Interest in the LVT was enough that the Secretary of the Navy formed the Continued Board for the Development of the Landing Vehicle Tracked on 30 October 1943.

Production continued throughout the war, resulting in 18,616 LVTs delivered. 23 US Army and 11 USMC battalions were equipped by 1945 with LVTs. British and Australian armies also used LVTs in combat during World War II.

In the late 1940s, a series of prototypes were built and tested, but none reached production stage due to lack of funding. Realizing that acquisition of new vehicles was unlikely, the Marines modernized some of the LVT-3s and LVT(A)-5s under projects SCB-60B and SCB-60A respectively, and kept them in service until the late 1950s.

Combat history

Guadalcanal
USMC LVT-1s were mainly used for logistical support at Guadalcanal. LVT-1 proved in this campaign its tactical capabilities, versatility and potential for amphibious operations.

As LVT-1s were unarmed, the Marines decided to arm them using any available machine gun. Each one was armed with three .30-caliber machine guns (sometimes water-cooled models) and a .50-caliber machine gun. Organization of LVTs of the Amphibian Tractor Battalions for the assault:
 Company "A" of 1st Battalion with thirty LVT-1 was assigned to the 5th Marines which was to land on Guadalcanal.
 A platoon of LVT-1s assigned to 2nd Marine Battalion went ashore on Tulagi.
 Company "B" was assigned to the 1st Marine Regiment.
 The remainder of the 1st Battalion remained with the 1st Division's support group.
 Company "A" of the 2nd Battalion was assigned to 2nd Marine Regiment, the landing force reserve.

Tarawa
In the amphibious assault on Tarawa in late 1943, the LVTs were first used for amphibious assault in order to negotiate the barrier reef, where several Higgins Boats had run aground and became stuck, and arrive to the most heavily defended beaches the Americans ever met in the Pacific. This was also the first use of the LVT-2 Water Buffalo in combat. 2nd Amphibian Tractor Battalion LVTs took part in the first, second, and third waves of landings and carried the continuous supply of ammunition, reinforcements, and ferrying back of the wounded. Of 125 vehicles used (50 new LVT-2s and 75 LVT-1s), only 35 remained operational by the end of the first day, continuing to ferry men and supplies across the coral reef and through the shallows to the beach.

The 2nd Amphibian Tractor Battalion had only about 79 LVT-1s and 50 LVT-2s (directly shipped from San Diego) available for the assault. Most of the troops had to disembark from LCVP "Higgins boats" and wade across the reef chest-deep or higher water while under heavy enemy fire. American casualties were very heavy and many who made to the beach alive had lost their rifles and other essential gear.

Developments in the Pacific
After Tarawa, many changes were made. The USMC recommended that a battalion of armored LVTs, two companies of DUKWs and two battalions of cargo LVTs be assigned to each division in future amphibious operations. The number of LVTs by battalion was increased to 300; before Tarawa it was 100. Due to mechanical reliability problems after every landing, the Marines replaced all LVTs used in operations.

As a result of Tarawa experience, standardized armor kits were provided for the LVTs to be used in contested landings. Other improvements were made in the damage repair area, machine gun shields, and in the LVT design to increase crew and LVT survivability.

The gun-armed "amtank" LVT(A)-1 and LVT(A)-4 were developed to provide fire support. Armed with a 75mm howitzer, the latter was introduced in 1944 just before the Marianas campaign and was especially effective in this role as it was capable of destroying Japanese fortifications as it came ashore. Its howitzer complemented the 75mm gun of the M4 Sherman tanks used by the Marines. However, the LVT(A)-4 had an open-topped turret which left the crew vulnerable to artillery and infantry attack, especially to the latter, as it lacked any sort of machine gun armament. The lack of machine gun armament was eventually rectified, though the open-topped turret remained in order to save weight. Although usually used in a direct role during landings only (once inland the "amtanks" were assigned to artillery formations to augment their firepower), in the Marianas campaign "amtanks" were employed inland, much like regular tanks.

Bougainville 
In November 1943, US Marines landed on the island of Bougainville. 29 LVTs were landed on the first day, with a total of 124 LVTs operating with the Marines during the landing.

Marshall Islands
In the campaign for the Marshall Islands, the full range of the LVT models became available, including armed Amtrac LVTs based on the proven LVT-2 with a tank gun turret. This provided close-in firepower as the cargo LVTs neared the beach. The combination of armoured cargo LVT-2 and the armed LVT(A)-1 together helped to capture the Marshalls far ahead of schedule.

Saipan
Saipan saw the massive use of the LVTs by the USMC with six battalions of cargo LVT, including the new ramped LVT-4, and two battalions of armored Amtracs, employing the new LVT(A)-4 with a 75 mm howitzer.

Tinian

At Tinian a field variant of the LVT-2 was created by the Seabees of the 3rd Battalion 18th Marines and 3rd Battalion 20th Marines. V Amphibious Corps chose beaches abutted by coral embankments up to 15 feet.  The Japanese thought the embankments made the beaches unsuitable for a landing. The CB engineers constructed detachable ramps mounted on LVTs to make such an assault possible. Salvaging iron beams from the damaged sugar factory on Saipan they fabricated 10 assault vehicles. Their commander, General Harry Schmidt, was skeptical and ordered a vehicle go up and down a ramp 100 times before approving their use in combat. The Tinian assault was a success.  The defenders were quickly overwhelmed compromising the remainder of the defenses.  The Seabees named their LVTs "doodlebugs".

Peleliu
From the Peleliu campaign on, a number of LVTs were fitted with a flamethrower for use against fortifications. The LVT was usually flanked by a pair of gun tanks for protection. A number of LVTs were converted to armored ambulances carrying a doctor and three corpsmen. LVTs were also employed as guide boats for tanks unloading onto submerged reefs.

Leyte
The largest use of LVTs was in the Leyte landing in October 1944, with nine US Army amtrac and two amtank battalions deployed by US Army 6th Army. These US Army LVTs were later used in other Philippine islands landings. 54 LVT(4) tracked amphibious assault vehicles of the 672nd Amphibian Tractor Battalion as part of the raiding force on 23 February 1945 forged across Laguna de Bay and crashed the gates during the liberation of Los Baños Internment Camp. They ferried the weakened liberated civilians back behind the lines during the contested withdrawal.

The US Army 826th Amphibious Tractor Battalion provided Company A to land 43rd Division troops in first wave of this first American return to the Philippine Islands. Following the landing Company A "amphibs" were utilized to transport dead and wounded, carry supplies inland and provide support throughout the invasion and subsequent taking of Leyte. Company A vehicles brought troops for the second major landing on Leyte at Ormoc. The Battalion provided vehicles for the landing at Luzon as well and during the conquest of Luzon personnel were heavily involved in clean-up operations of Japanese troops left behind the advance.

Iwo Jima
The LVT-4 played a crucial role both as the assault vehicle to carry troops and as the chief logistical vehicle in the first days of Battle of Iwo Jima. Ashore, the LVTs were used to rescue wheeled vehicles that could not navigate Iwo Jima's soft volcanic ash and steep terraces. In addition, American troops used the LVTs to transport casualties from the front lines to evacuation sites on the beaches. The 75 mm howitzer on the LVT-4 provided important fire support as the Marines slowly advanced across the island.

Okinawa
This was the largest landing in the Central Pacific drive. The new LVT-3, a redesign of internal arrangements, was used successfully through the long Okinawa campaign. Over 1000 LVTs took part in the Battle of Okinawa.

Europe

In Europe, LVTs were mainly used for landings and river crossing operations as well as assaults in swampy zones. By the end of 1943, 200 LVT-1s had been delivered to the British Army for training in preparation for future operations in Europe. The U.S., British, and Canadian armies used the Buffalo in the 1944 Battle of the Scheldt in the Low Countries, during Operation Plunder crossing of the Rhine in March 1945, along the Po River in Italy, across the river Elbe, and in a number of other river crossing operations.

LVTs were used in the Normandy landings, but their use by the United States was limited as the US Army doctrine in Europe viewed the Sherman DD as the answer to assault on heavily defended beaches. LVT-2s were used to help unload supplies after the landings on Utah Beach from the cargo ships off the coast to the beach and through the nearby swamps.

For the Rhine crossing, the British 21st Army Group had some 600 Buffalos available, most of them used to transport the assault infantry. As mud was expected to hamper the Sherman DD tanks, some LVTs were armed with a 20 mm cannon and two machine guns to give fire support until bridges could be constructed across the river. The "Specials" were under the 79th Armoured Division (which operated and coordinated the use of all specialist assault vehicles), that also provided Buffalos fitted with "Bobbin" carpets to create temporary roadways over the mud.

The US Army used LVT-2s and LVT-4s in Europe in small numbers in 1944–45 for river crossing operations. LVT-2s and LVT-4s were used by US troops on the Roer River crossing in 1945. US Army LVT-4's were also used by 752nd Tank Battalion to ferry 88th Infantry Division troops across the Po River in Italy in April 1945.

Five LVT-4s were supplied through Lend-Lease to the Soviet Red Army, which used them when assaulting the well-defended west banks of the Oder and Danube rivers.

North Africa
The first operational use of the LVT in North Africa was in November 1942. A small number of LVT-1s were used during the landings on the coast of North Africa during Operation Torch. Four LVT-1s and two bulldozers were assigned to each shore party engineer company. Their tasks were towing vehicles and boat salvage operations. LVT-1s proved useful in getting stranded landing craft afloat, but they also experienced many mechanical failures.

South East Asia
Some of the reconnaissance units of the British Fourteenth Army in Burma operated LVT-1s. Although originally planned to fight against the Japanese on the Burmese coast at the end of 1943, this part of the operations plan was cancelled and no LVT-1s were used in combat. In 1945, the Royal Marines Amphibious support unit was created. Its LVT-4s and LVT(A)-4s supported Royal Marines landings in Burma and Malaya.

Post-World War II

Some LVT-3s, LVT-3Cs, and modified LVT(A)-5s saw action in the Korean War. The French Army used the U.S.-supplied LVT-4s and LVT(A)-4s in the Indochina War and in the Suez Crisis. During the Korean War, LVT(3)Cs and LVT(A)s were used for the landing in Incheon and subsequent Han River  crossing to re-take Seoul. It was also used in the evacuation of Hungnam Harbour when Chinese forces attacked. The LVT(3)C was used by USMC in Korea as both an amphibious vehicle, and in the role of an armored personnel carrier while on land. Nationalist China (ROC) forces used some US-provided LVT-4s and LVT(A)-4s during China's civil war against communist Chinese troops. Many were captured by communist Chinese forces, with at least several dozen refitted with a Soviet ZiS-2 57 mm anti-tank gun in place of the original US 75 mm howitzer-gun following their successful capture of mainland China from the Chinese Nationalists in 1949.

French Indochina 
French armored units developed the use of amphibious tracked vehicles in Indochina: The amphibious C model of the M29 Weasel (armed either with Chaterrault M1924/29, Bren or Browning M1919 machine guns and with 57mm M18A1 recoilless guns), LVT-4s (equipped with two M2 and two M1919 machine guns, and sometimes equipped with 40mm Bofors guns or 57 mm recoilless guns) and LVT(A)-4 (with 75 mm howitzer) were used to great effect by 1er Régiment Etrangers de Cavalerie. In 1950, the French Army received a number of LVT-4s and LVT(A)-4s from the US to supplement M29Cs. In September 1951, the first French mixed unit (1er Groupement Autonome) was created, consisting of two squadrons of Weasels (33 each), three squadrons of LVT-4 (11 each) and one fire support platoon of 6 LVT(A)-4. Later a second group was created in Tonkin when more LVTs were received. Both these groups participated in Mekong and Red River delta operations and in landing operations on Vietnam shores. The  also deployed a platoon of LVTs. LVTs were known as "alligators" in French armed forces.

Suez 
During the 1956 Suez Canal crisis, 40 and 42 Commando of the Royal Marines made a landing in Port Said in LVTs, supported by a number of Centurion tanks from the Royal Tank Regiment. The French Navy assigned 13 LVT-4s to the Force H, to be used by the 1ère compagnie du 1er R.E.P. and 3eme Marine Commando during their assault on Port Fuad.

Other operators
At the end of the war, the oldest LVT versions were disposed as surplus and sold to other countries. Only LVT-3 and LVT(A)-5s remained in operational use in the US armed forces. In 1947 a dozen Buffalo LTV's were being used by the British Army who were working to fix a breach in the flood defences at Crowland in Lincolnshire fens following the terrible winter that year. Five LTV's were swept away and lost in flood waters. On 29 April 2021 one of the missing units was excavated from 30 feet below the surface after being located in an English field. (See also #Preservation.) During Operation Highjump, the United States Navy Antarctic Developments Program from 1946 to 1947, LVT-3's and LVT-4's were tested in Antarctic conditions.

Modern descendants 
In the 1950s, LVTs still in service were replaced by the LVTP-5 family of vehicles, which in turn were followed by the LVT-7 family, eventually redesignated Amphibious Assault Vehicle (AAV). The AAV is manufactured by BAE Systems Land and Armaments, which is the successor company to FMC.

In 1958, the US Navy tested the largest LVT ever produced, the LVT(U)X2 Goliath produced by Pacific Car and Foundry. The Goliath was large enough to transport any load the conventional Landing Craft Utility could carry, including a 60-ton main battle tank, from a landing dock ship to shore and across beach barriers. Only one Goliath was built and it never became operational.

Currently, many of the world's militaries employ more modern versions of the amtrack. One of the latest is the now cancelled United States Marine Corps Expeditionary Fighting Vehicle, that was slated to begin replacing the AAV in 2015 but was cancelled in 2011 after going significantly over budget.

Variants 
The US Army used a different naming system from the Navy but instead of using the usual Army system of Model (M)-numbers, they referred to the LVTs by Mark number using Roman numerals rather than Arabic numerals. Hence the LVT-4 was the "Mark IV". In British service LVTs were given  service names and mark numbers to distinguish them.

LVT-1

The first military model. It was powered by a Hercules WXLC  six-cylinder petrol engine, mounted in a housing in the rear cargo hold. The LVT-1 was propelled on both land and water by tracks which were fitted with Roebling patented oblique shoes that gave good grip on land as well as good drive in the water. The hold was divided into several watertight compartments. 1,225 LVT-1s were built between 1941 and 1943, 485 were transferred to the US Army and 200 to the British Army.

No armor or weapons were included in its design as its role was cargo transport from ship to shore. Many vehicles were refitted prior to the Tarawa landing to hold two  Browning heavy machine guns forward, with the .30 guns aft. The vehicle was not armored and its thin steel hull offered virtually no protection, although prior to Tarawa some vehicles received  of armor plating to the cab. Tracks performed well on sand, but not on tough surfaces. The rigid suspension threw tracks and roller bearings corroded in salt water. Proper maintenance of the new machine was often an issue, as few Marines were trained to work on it, and early models suffered frequent breakdowns. As LVT-1 vehicles experienced many breakdowns they were gradually phased out of operational use before 1945.

LVT-2 Water Buffalo, British designation Buffalo II

This was an improved version of LVT-1. It featured a new powertrain (to save time and to simplify production it was the same Continental radial 7-cylinder engine as that in the M3A1 Stuart light tank) in the rear of the hull with a propshaft along the centreline to the transmission at the front, and torsilastic suspension. The aluminium track grousers were bolted on, making changes much easier since they wore out quickly on land and even more so on coral. Hard terrain performance was much better compared to the LVT-1. 2,962 units were produced for the US Navy, who then proceeded to transfer 1,507 to the US Army and 100 to the British Army. Portable plating of "10 lb" rating on the sponson sides and hull rear and '20 lb' on the front and cab could be fitted.

Rails for mounting machine guns ran round the sides and rear of the cargo space and across the back of the cab,

LVT-2s participated in more campaigns than any other LVT variant, including Tarawa, Roi-Namur, Cape Gloucester, Northern Kwajalein, Saipan, Guam, Tinian, Peleliu, Iwo Jima, Okinawa and in some parts of Europe, such as the Rhine crossing of Operation Plunder.

LVT(A)-1
The LVT(A) Mark 1 was the first infantry support LVT. With the first experience of Pacific amphibious operations it was clear heavier firepower than the usual .50 in guns was needed. It was fitted with a turret nearly identical to that of the Light Tank M3, with a 37 mm Gun M6 in an M44 mount and coaxial 0,30-inch machine gun. Two more 0.30-inch machine guns on ring mounts on the rear deck behind the turret, 509 units were produced. It was powered by a  air-cooled petrol engine.

These vehicles were intended to provide fire support to the assaulting Marines in the early stages of establishing a beachhead. It was common, however, for the LVT(A)s to commence firing whilst still in the water.

At Roi-Namur, the 24th Marines had support of LVT(A)-1s, but they could not close up enough to effectively support the troops from the beaches. Other LVT(A)-1s supported the 22nd Marines landing at Engebi. By mid-1944, all LVT(A)-1s had been replaced by much more capable 75mm gun armed LVT(A)-4s. This switch was primarily due to the LVT(A)-1 M6 gun lacking adequate bunker busting capabilities. The inability to neutralize bunkers on or near the beachheads was an inherent risk for Marines storming out of their landing craft.

LVT(A)-2 Water Buffalo
This was an armored version of the LVT-2, following the US Army's request for an armored variant of the LVT-2. Service in the South Pacific soon indicated more protection was needed. By 1944, shields were added to protect the front gunners. Surprisingly the additional  of armor, added to the  weight of the unarmored LVT-2, had no impact on performance and only caused the craft to draw an additional  of water when afloat. The LVT(A)-2 had a capacity of 18 troops. 450 units produced.

LVT-4 Water Buffalo, British designation Buffalo IV
FMC modified an LVT-2 in August 1943 by moving the engine forward and adding a large ramp door in the rear, allowing troops to exit from the rear of the vehicle. Capacity went from 16 troops in the LVT-2 to 30, making earlier LVTs largely obsolete. This innovation also greatly facilitated the loading and unloading of cargo. Some vehicles received armor kits. It was by far the most numerous version of the LVT, with 8,348 units delivered; the US Army received 6,083, and the British Army 500. Many of the British LVT-4 were armed with a 20 mm Polsten cannon and two .30 in (7.62 mm) Browning machine guns. Removable 20 lb and 10 lb armor kits could be fitted.

Since no major changes were made to the engine and transmission of the LVT-2, the LVT-4 was completed much quicker than the LVT-3, with the first machines going into action at Saipan in June 1944.

Sea Serpent
The Sea Serpent was designed by the 79th Armoured Division for use by the British in the Far East. Its armament was two "Wasp" flamethrowers and a machine gun. These would have been used by the "flame battery" of the 34th Amphibian Support Regiment, Royal Marines in any assault on the Japanese mainland but the war ended before they were used.

LVT(A)-3
Developed as a version of the LVT-4 with armor built in but never approved for production.

LVT-3 Bushmaster

Developed by the Borg Warner Corporation as their Model B in April 1943. To allow for rear loading, the engines were moved to the sponsons and a ramp installed in the rear, and the cargo area was slightly wider to provide room for a Jeep to be carried in the cargo hold. Some received armor kits. First used in combat in Okinawa in April 1945. The twin  Cadillac V-8 petrol engines were connected by driveshafts to the transmission (the same as the M5 light tank) in the front of the hull. It performed with efficiency and greater reliability, as more maintenance time was generally available than during World War II. The LVT(3)C remained standard with the Marine Corps until the introduction of the first major post—war design, the LVT(P)5, in 1953.

LVT(A)-4

The 37 mm gun of the LVT(A)-1 was inadequate for fire support version so the turret of the 75 mm Howitzer Motor Carriage M8armed with a 75 mm howitzerwas used to produce the LVT(A)-4. In some cases, the 75 mm was replaced with the Canadian Ronson flamethrower. A single .50 cal machine gun was installed on the ring mount above the turret rear. In late production vehicles, the heavy machine gun was replaced with two .30 caliber M1919A4 machine guns on pintle mounts on the sides of the turret, and one more in the bow. 1,890 units produced, with 1,307 were transferred to the US Army and 50 to the British Army. The hull was armoured as the Mark 1 but the open-topped M8 turret was up to 1-inch thick.

The Chinese PLA captured several from Nationalist forces during the Civil War and placed them in service, eventually modifying some by replacing the 75 mm howitzer with the 37 mm M6 tank gun and others with the ZiS-2 57 mm anti-tank gun, complete with shield, the conversion also necessitating the removal of the original mantlet.

LVT(A)-5

Introduced in 1945, the LVT(A)-5 was a LVT(A)-4 with a powered turret and a gyrostabilizer for the howitzer. Some were upgraded in the late 1940s by modifying the armor configuration. 269 units produced.

LVT-3C
Modified LVT-3. An armored roof was fitted and the bow was extended to improve buoyancy. Armament included a .30 inch machine gun in a turret and another in a ball mount in the bow. 1,200 LVT-3s were converted.

Amphibian, tracked, 4-ton General Service ("Neptune")
A British vehicle based on the LVT-4, known as the Neptune, was built by Nuffield. Only a handful of the 2,000 ordered were completed. The Sealion was a recovery version, and the Turtle a workshop version.

Preservation 
In 1947, a Buffalo  LVT being used in flood defence work in Crowland, Lincolnshire, UK, was swept away and buried. In 2021, it was excavated and retrieved, and volunteers are planning to preserve and restore it to running order. In June 2022 it was put on display in Thorney, Cambridgeshire, as part of the commemoration of the 75th anniversary of the floods. A second vehicle may also be recovered from the site.

See also 
 WWII/Korea LVT Museum
 Landwasserschlepper
 DUKW
 Terrapin (amphibious vehicle)
 2nd Assault Amphibian Battalion

Notes

References 

 TM 9-784
 TM 9-1784
 
 
 
 
 
  
 Navy Department. ONI-226 Allied Landing Craft 1943.

External links 

 Origins of the Amphtrack at Globalsecurity.org
  – WW2 Vehicles
 AmTracs of World War II and the Korean War at Amtrac.org
 , June 1944, Popular Mechanics
  – WWII and Korea LVT Museum
 , October 1941, Popular Science – close up photo of first Amtrack vehicle tested
 Meet The LVT's Beach Busters, pp 121–124, at Google Books, September 1945, Popular Science
  – LVT(A)-4 with Flamethrower engaged at Battle of Peleliu

Amphibious armoured fighting vehicles
World War II armored fighting vehicles of the United States
Amphibious vehicles of World War II
Tracked amphibious vehicles
Military vehicles introduced from 1940 to 1944
Armoured personnel carriers of WWII
Tracked armoured personnel carriers